San Francesco is a Roman Catholic church located on Via San Francesco #7 in Fidenza, Province of Parma, Italy.

History
The Franciscans were late in arriving to Fidenza, and in 1573 were housed in the church of Santa Maria della Rocca, inside the town's castle walls. By two years later, they had built a nearby convent. But conflicts with the soldiers led to them moving in 1582 to a site near what is today the Parco delle Rimembranze, where by 1585 they built a church and convent.

They were expelled from these premises in 1866/67 by the new civil authorities, and found homes in various spots, the Oratorio del Pilastro; then in 1876 in the Oratorio della Crocetta. Here they rebuilt a new convent, and a church was built in 1883-1884 and dedicated to the Sacro Cuore di Gesù. The church was built in brick, in a simple style recalling Lombard-Romanesque. The first chapel on the left has the tombs of Enrichetta d’Este and Leopoldo d’Assia Darmstadt completed by the sculptor Boudard in 1765. The Franciscan convent and parish are still active.

References

Churches in the province of Parma
Roman Catholic churches in Emilia-Romagna
19th-century Roman Catholic church buildings in Italy
Roman Catholic churches completed in 1585